Christian Justus Watson (born May 12, 1999) is an American football wide receiver for the Green Bay Packers of the National Football League (NFL). He played college football at North Dakota State, and was selected by the Packers in the second round of the 2022 NFL Draft.

Early life and high school career
Watson was born in Phoenix, Arizona and grew up in Tampa, Florida, where he attended Henry B. Plant High School. He played for Plant's junior varsity football team for his first two years of high school. Watson began his freshman year at 5-foot-9 and ended his senior season at 6-foot-2. He gained 20 pounds between his junior and senior years. His growth allowed him to be more successful on the field, where he caught 23 passes for 393 yards and eight touchdowns as a senior.

Watson was lightly recruited coming out of high school, in large part due to a lack of playing time until his senior season. He committed to play college football at North Dakota State University entering his senior year.

High school statistics

College career
Watson redshirted his freshman season. As a redshirt freshman the following year, he caught nine passes for 165 yards as the Bison won the 2018 FCS national championship. As a redshirt sophomore, Watson caught 34 passes for 732 yards and six touchdowns and was named second-team All-Missouri Valley Football Conference (MVFC). 

He had 19 catches for 442 yards and one touchdown and was named first-team All-MVFC and 1st team All-American(AP) as an All-Purpose player in his redshirt junior season, which was shortened and played in early 2021 due to the COVID-19 pandemic. He repeated as a first-team All-MVFC selection, and was named second-team All-American(AP) after catching 43 passes for 801 yards and seven touchdowns in his redshirt senior season. Watson and the Bison won the 2021 FCS national championship, beating Montana State 38-10. He missed almost the entire postseason in his senior season. Watson also played in the 2022 Senior Bowl where he was voted National WR of the Week.

College statistics

Professional career

During the 2022 NFL Combine, Watson was ranked 97th overall and 15th wide receiver in the class by Bleacher Report Scouting

Watson was selected as the second pick of the second round (34th overall) in the 2022 NFL Draft by the Green Bay Packers. He was the seventh wide receiver selected in the draft. Watson was the only wide receiver from North Dakota State University to be drafted in the past thirty-seven years. On July 20, 2022, he signed his rookie contract., a four-year deal with the Packers worth $9,241,031.

During the offseason, Watson suffered a minor knee injury that required him to undergo knee surgery which caused him to miss the majority of training camp. 

In Watsons' NFL debut, during Week 1 against the Minnesota Vikings, Watson, on his first NFL play, dropped Rodgers’ first throw of the game on a deep route on which he had beaten former All-Pro Patrick Peterson. After the dropped pass, Rodgers did not look toward Watson until the end of the fourth quarter. He finished the game with two receptions for 32 yards, and rushing once for an additional seven in the 23–7 loss. In Week 4, against the New England Patriots, Watson scored his first NFL touchdown on a 15-yard rush.

During Week 8, in the first quarter against the Buffalo Bills, Watson suffered from a concussion. Watson went out for a 12 yard pass during their first offensive possession, and he received a hard hit to the head. Although they brought out a board for assistance, he eventually was able to walk off the field.

In Week 10 against the Dallas Cowboys, Watson had a breakout performance, catching four passes for 107 yards and three touchdowns in the 31-28 overtime win. After multiple drops on the opening drive, Watson scored the Packers’ longest and second longest touchdowns of the season, a 58 yard score from Rodgers in the second quarter, and a 39 yard touchdown in the 4th quarter. He also scored a 7 yard touchdown in the 4th quarter to tie the game near the end of regulation.  For this performance, Watson won NFL Week 10 Rookie of the Week.

He had another solid performance the following week, with two touchdowns on 4 catches with 48 yards in a 27-17 loss to the Tennessee Titans.

In Week 12, Watson had four catches for 110 yards and a touchdown in the 40-33 loss to the Philadelphia Eagles.

For his performance in the month of November, Watson was awarded Rookie of the Month.

Watson finished his rookie year with 41 receptions for 611 yards and 7 receiving touchdowns, as well as 2 rushing touchdowns(tied for both the most receiving and total touchdowns among all Rookies).

NFL career statistics

Personal life
Watson's father, Tim Watson, played safety in the NFL during the 1990s for the Packers, Eagles, Chiefs, and Giants. He was a sixth-round selection of the Packers in the 1993 NFL Draft. His father now goes by Tazim Wajid Wajed.

Watson has four siblings, a brother and three sisters. Watson's older brother, Tre Watson, played linebacker at Maryland and Illinois and was an All-Big Ten selection.  He currently plays in the XFL.

References

External links
Green Bay Packers bio
North Dakota State Bison bio

1999 births
Living people
Players of American football from Tampa, Florida
American football wide receivers
North Dakota State Bison football players
Green Bay Packers players
Henry B. Plant High School alumni